Hainald's rat (Rattus hainaldi) is a species of rodent in the family Muridae. It is found only on Flores Island in Indonesia, including on Mount Ranaka. Part of its habitat is protected within the Kelimutu National Park.

References

 

Rattus
Rats of Asia
Endemic fauna of Indonesia
Rodents of Flores
Rodents of Indonesia
Endangered fauna of Asia
Mammals described in 1991
Taxonomy articles created by Polbot